Bharat Jodo Yatra (lit: Unite India March) was a mass movement which was held by the political party Indian National Congress ("the Congress" or INC as short form).

According to INC, the movement was intended to unite the country against the "divisive politics" of the Bharatiya Janata Party (BJP)-led Government of India. The Bharat Jodo Yatra movement was launched by Rahul Gandhi and Tamil Nadu chief minister M. K. Stalin; on September 7, 2022. Its main objective was to protest against the politics of "fear, bigotry and prejudice", and the economics of livelihood destruction, increasing unemployment and growing inequality. During the movement, the INC elected a new party president and also won a majority in the 2022 Himachal Pradesh Legislative Assembly election, its first majority it won by itself since 2018.

Background

The Indian National Congress launched the logo, tagline, and website for Bharat Jodo Yatra at AICC headquarters on 23 August 2022. The march started from Kanyakumari on 7 September. It was planned as a -long, 150-day "non-stop" march that would pass through 12 states and two Union Territories. During the march, Congress Member of Parliament (MP) Rahul Gandhi would meet people during the day and would sleep in makeshift accommodation at night. These makeshift accommodations were mobile containers specially built by Tata Corporation. The march started from Kanyakumari and was to end in Srinagar, and would be accomplished entirely on foot. Marchers were scheduled to cover approximately  each day in two shifts. 

The Bharat Jodo Yatra has similarities to ex-prime minister of India Chandra Shekhar's nearly -long Bharat Yatra march of 1983.

Schedule

Methods 

The Bharat Jodo Yatra used a variety of slogans, poetry, and songs, such as Mile Kadam, Jude Vatan (walk together, unite the country), Mehengai Se Nata Todo, Mil Kar Bharat Jodo (break ties with inflation, unite India), Berozagari Ka Jaal Todo, Bharat Jodo (break the web of unemployment, unite India), Nafrat Chhodo, Bharat Jodo (quit hate, unite the country) and Samvidhan Bachao (save the constitution) among others. Marchers, who were termed padayatris, would speak with members of civil society every day during the break. Public rallies were also held during the march. On October 15, Rahul Gandhi's public gathering in Ballari amid heavy rainfall got widespread media coverage.

Participants
Throughout the five-month long yatra, there were three types of Padyatris. Bharat Yatris, who will walk the yatra throughout its whole journey. Atithi Yatris, guest marchers from states through which Bharat Jodo Yatra is not travelling, will be the second group. The third group to finish the march will be the Pradesh Yatris, a group of 100 yatris from states the march is travelling through and they will be a part of the yatra in that state. Three hundred padyatris will be marching at any moment. Few prominent people joining the yatra are

Supporters 
Many grassroots movements have been joining or endorsing the Bharat Jodo Yatra. The INC appealed to individuals, organizations, and movements to join the yatra. More than 200 civil society members have appealed people to support Congress' Bharat Jodo Yatra. The Congress invited Bihar chief minister Nitish Kumar and deputy chief minister Tejashwi Yadav to join the yatra respectively. Nitish Kumar declined to join the Bharat Jodo Yatra

In late September, as the march was set to enter Karnataka, at least 89 organizations based in the state announced their support for and participation in the protest march. Prominent participants in the Karnataka phase of the march include author Devanur Mahadeva and literary critic G. N. Devy.

 Amol Palekar and Sandhya Gokhale, Director and Writer
 Rashmi Desai, TV actress 
 Akanksha Puri, Indian actress and model 
 Riya Sen, Actress 
 Ramesh Pisharody, Comedian

Timeline

Week 1 (7-13 September)

Rahul Gandhi launched the yatra on 7 September 2022 at Kanyakumari after paying tributes to his late father Rajiv Gandhi, Swami Vivekananda, and the Tamil poet Thiruvalluvar. The Congress said the yatra was "India's biggest mass contact program", during which the concerns of the people will reach Delhi.

Week 2 (14-20 September)

The yatra reached Kollam on 14 September, as Rahul Gandhi paid his respects to Sri Narayana Guru. He met local cashew workers and promised to bring up their grievances in the upcoming parliamentary session. The yatra entered cities such as Kollam, Alappuzha, and Kochi during this week.

Week 3 (21-27 September)

Rahul Gandhi paid floral tributes to Mahatma Gandhi in Kochi on 22 September. BJP leaders falsely said the break in the protest march on 23 September was in solidarity with the Popular Front of India (PFI). Hollywood actor John Cusack expressed his solidarity with Rahul Gandhi. Kerala High Court dismissed plea to regulate the Bharat Jodo Yatra. The marchers entered Thrissur, Malappuram, and Gudalur in Tamil Nadu on 29 September.

Week 4 (28 September-4 December)
The last day of the yatra in Kerala was 28 September before it moved into Tamil Nadu and then Karnataka. It reached Nilgiris in Tamil Nadu the day after. On 30 September, it entered Karnataka, attracting huge crowds. Police started cracking down on the PayCM campaign. Rahul Gandhi paid floral tributes to Mahatma Gandhi on the occasion of Gandhi Jayanthi. He also targeted the BJP on its handling of the COVID-19 pandemic in Karnataka. Yatra took a break at Mandya on 4 October.

Week 5 (5-11 October)

Sonia Gandhi joined the yatra on 6 October, despite being unwell. Late journalist Gauri Lankesh's family joined Bharat Jodo Yatra as it completed 30 days on the road. The yatra received an impressive response from the local public in Tumakuru district. It reached Chitradurga district on 11 October.

Week 6 (11-17 October)

Rahul Gandhi met unemployed youth in Chitradurga district. The Congress stressed the importance of the Kannada language and other regional languages. The yatra entered Anantapur district in Andhra Pradesh on 14 October, drawing a large crowd. It re-entered Karnataka the day later, completing  in Bellary district.

Week 7 (18-24 October)

The yatra re-entered Andhra Pradesh via Kurnool district on October 18, before returning to Karnataka on 21 October. The yatra entered Telangana on 23 October, followed by a three-day Diwali break.

Week 8 (25-31 October)

Following the  Diwali break, the yatra resumed in Telangana on October 27, attracting massive crowds. It passed through many major districts such as Mahabubnagar, Narayanpet, Sangareddy, and Ranga Reddy. On 29 October 2022, Rahul Gandhi was joined by Tollywood actor Poonam Kaur as the marchers approached Jadcherla, a town in Mahabubnagar district.

Week 9 (1-7 November)

On 1 November 2022, Late Dalit scholar Rohith Vemula's mother joined the Bharat Jodo Yatra to walk alongside Rahul Gandhi, en route to Hyderabad. Rahul Gandhi unfurled the national flag in front of the Charminar, over 32 years after his father, then-party-chief Rajiv Gandhi had started the Sadbhavna Yatra from the same spot on 19 October 1990.

On 2 November 2022, actor and filmmaker Pooja Bhatt joined Bharat Jodo Yatra in Hyderabad on the 56th day of the protest march. On the evening of 7 November 2022, the 61st day of the march, Bharat Jodo Yatra entered Maharashtra. The yatra crossed from Menuru village in Madnoor Mandal district of Telangana to Nanded district in Maharashtra.

Week 10 (8-14 November)

On 10 November 2022, Bollywood actor Sushant Singh joined Bharat Jodo Yatra in Nanded.

On 11 November 2022, Shiv Sena, leader and former Maharashtra Minister Aaditya Thackeray joined the Bharat Jodo Yatra in Hingoli district. The march entered its 65th day, and its fifth day in Maharashtra.

Week 11 (15-21 November)

On 16 November 2022, activist Medha Patkar joined Bharat Jodo Yatra in Washim.  On 17 November 2022, actor Riya Sen joined the march in Akola. Rahul Gandhi said Vinayak Damodar Savarkar had helped the British. On 18 November 2022, Mahatma Gandhi's great-grandson Tushar Gandhi and actor Mona Ambegaonkar joined Rahul during Bharat Jodo Yatra in Shegaon, Buldhana district. On 19 November, the birthday of Indira Gandhi, actors Rashami Desai and Akanksha Puri, and actor-turned-politician Nagma joined the march in Buldhana district; and on 20 November 2022, actor Amol Palekar joined Bharat Jodo Yatra on its last day in Maharashtra in Jalgaon Jamod.

Week 12 (22-28 November)

On 24 November 2022, Priyanka Gandhi and her husband Robert Vadra joined Bharat Jodo Yatra in Madhya Pradesh. In Burhanpur, Rahul Gandhi said the yatra was a march against the hatred, violence, and fear that is being spread in India. During a meeting with banana-plantation and powerloom workers from Burhanpur region, Gandhi talked about unemployment and farm issues. Former CM of Madhya Pradesh Digvijaya Singh underplayed the electoral impact of the yatra.

Congress communication chief Jairam Ramesh stated Bharat Jodo yatra is a way for the party to connect with the people. The response to the protest march has given Congress confidence to undertake similar marches from west to east in 2023. Rahul Gandhi described both Ashok Gehlot and Sachin Pilot as assets to the party. Bharat Jodo Yatra was now in the seventh state. Rahul Gandhi stated the yatra had moved beyond Congress and had started "echoing the voice of India".

Week 13 (29 November-5 December)

Bharat Jodo Yatra entered Rajasthan on 4 December 2022, a Congress-ruled state for the first time. Rahul Gandhi said Bharat Jodo Yatra had taught him things that cannot be learnt while travelling in any other mode of transport.

Week 14 (6-12 December)

On 9 December 2022, Congress General Secretary (Communications) Jairam Ramesh said Bharat Jodo Yatra would take a nine-day break on December 25 and resume on January 3, 2023. The yatra was expected to reach Delhi by December 24 and maintenance work on the 60 containers would be done in Noida. On 11 December 2022, actor Digangana Suryavanshi joined Bharat Jodo Yatra in Bundi district.

Week 15 (13-19 December) 

On 13 December, Bharat Jodo Yatra resumed from Jeenapur in Sawai Madhopur district, Rajasthan. The following day, former Reserve Bank of India (RBI) governor Raghuram Rajan joined Bharat Jodo Yatra in Sawai Madhopur district.

Bharat Jodo Yatra completed 100 days on 16 December 2022. Himachal Pradesh Chief Minister Sukhvinder Singh Sukhu, Mukesh Agnihotri deputy CM, and the state's Congress chief Pratibha Singh walked alongside Rahul Gandhi. Singer Sunidhi Chauhan performed at a concert marking the completion of 100 days of the protest at Albert Hall Museum in Jaipur on 16 December. On 19 December, while addressing a rally in Alwar, Rajasthan, Rahul Gandhi highlighted the importance of English and said around 1,700 English-medium schools had been opened in Rajasthan. He said BJP leaders do not want English to be taught in schools but children of BJP leaders go to English-medium schools.

Week 16 (20-26 December) 

Former Punjab chief minister Charanjit Singh Channi joined Bharat Jodo Yatra at Alwar on 20 December 2022. The next day, the protest march entered Haryana from Mundaka in Nuh district, and resumed from Patan Udaipuri in Nuh, Haryana after a flag-handover ceremony. On 23 December,  Dravida Munnetra Kazhagam (DMK) MP Kanimozhi joined Bharat Jodo Yatra. She said she was delighted to be a part of the foot march that celebrates India's diversity. 

On 24 December, Bharat Jodo Yatra entered Delhi at Badarpur after resuming from NHPC Chowk metro station. Makkal Needhi Maiam (MNM) president Kamal Haasan, who is an actor-turned politician, joined the march in New Delhi. During his speech at Red Fort, Hassan stated he joined the foot march as an Indian and when it comes to country, all party lines have to blur. Rahul Gandhi said he had not seen any hatred or violence among people while walking . At that point, the protest march had covered  from Gandhi Mandapam in Kanyakumari.

Week 17 (3-9 January 2023)

After a nine-day year-end break, Bharat Jodo Yatra resumed its second leg from Hanuman Mandir at Kashmir gate on January 3, 2023. According to The Hindu, senior Congress leader Jaiprakash Agarwal said the protest was "echoing the voice of the citizens". Bharat Jodo Yatra entered Uttar Pradesh from Loni in Ghaziabad district. Former Research and Analysis Wing chief A. S. Dulat, and former Jammu and Kashmir Chief Minister Farooq Abdullah joined Bharat Jodo Yatra. On 5 January 2023, Bollywood actor Ritu Shivpuri joined the march in Shamli, Uttar Pradesh.

Week 18 (10-16 January 2023)

Bharat Jodo Yatra entered Punjab at Shambhu on 10 January 2023. Rahul Gandhi visited the Golden Temple in Amritsar before the yatra started in the state. On 14 January, Congress MP from Jalandhar Santokh Singh Chaudhary died during the march after suffering a heart attack in Phillaur. On 15 January, father of late Punjabi singer Sidhu Moose Wala and historian Mridula Mukherjee joined Bharat Jodo Yatra.

Week 19 (17-23 January 2023)

On 18 January 2023, Bharat Jodo Yatra entered Himachal Pradesh and travelled  in the state. The following evening, the protest march entered Jammu and Kashmir at Pathankot with a flag-handover ceremony at Lakhanpur in Kathua district. National Conference President and MP Farooq Abdullah stated he joined the yatra to highlight the need to strengthen the idea of unity in diversity, and said Rahul Gandhi was "doing the job of joining the hearts of people". Farooq Abdullah also compared Rahul Gandhi To Adi Shankaracharya and stated that Shankaracharya was the first person who conducted a digvijaya yatra from Kanyakumari to Kashmir and similarly, Rahul Gandhi is doing that yet again. On 20 January 2023, Param Vir Chakra recipient Captain Bana Singh joined Bharat Jodo Yatra in Jammu and Kashmir.

Week 20 (24-30 January 2023)
On 24 January 2023, Actor-politician Urmila Matondkar and prominent author Perumal Murugan joined the Bharat Jodo Yatra in Jammu's garrison town of Nagrota. After unfurling the tricolour flag at the Srinagar's historic Lal Chowk, which marked the end of 137-day-long foot march from Kannyiakumari to Kashmir, Congress leader Rahul Gandhi said that the Bharat Jodo Yatra has given an alternative vision of the politics to the country. Rahul Gandhi unfurled that national flag at the historic clock tower and sang the national anthem to send a strong message of nationalism.

Reactions

National
 The Bharatiya Janata Party (BJP) criticized the rally and called it "Parivar Bachao Rally" (Save Family March). At that time, the Congress was preparing to hold its presidential election. On 18 September, BJP Tamil Nadu president C.T. Ravi posted a picture of Rahul Gandhi and his niece on Twitter; Ravi deleted the tweet after public outrage and a case was filed against him. The Congress replied, saying the BJP was "rattled" by the yatra and its immense public support.
The Dravida Munnetra Kazhagam supported the Yatra; M.K. Stalin was present to launch the Yatra at Kanyakumari on 7 September 2022.
 The Nationalist Congress Party (NCP) initially distanced itself from the yatra; its leader P. C. Chacko said; "Cong's yatra aimed to prove it is not dead". NCP chief Sharad Pawar, however, dubbed the yatra "immensely useful" for the Congress and Rahul Gandhi. Senior NCP leaders  Jayant Patil, Supriya Sule, and Jitendra Awhad joined the Bharat Jodo Yatra when it entered the state of Maharashtra.
 The Shiv Sena (UBT) (SS (UBT)) through its publication Saamana supported the yatra and accused the BJP of being scared of the protest march. SS (UBT) leader Sanjay Raut stated Rahul Gandhi keeps friendship and affection alive despite political differences. Raut attributed the tremendous response to the march to love and compassion.
 The Aam Aadmi Party dismissed the yatra, saying it is of "no consequence".
 The Communist Party of India (Marxist) (CPI (M))initially criticized the Congress in a Twitter post that read; "18 days in Kerala...2 days in UP. Strange way to fight BJP-RSS". The Congress said Kerala is a long south-to-north state; "It takes 370 kilometres from Kanyakumari to go through Kerala and reach Karnataka. If it took two days of rest days, it would take 18 days to cover that distance." The CPI (M)'s general secretary Sitaram Yechury said; "Every party has the legitimate right to interact with the populace. Going to people is good". He also said the CPI (M) would join efforts to unite the opposition parties to defend the constitution.
 The People's Democratic Party supported the yatra, with party chief Mehbooba Mufti accepting the Congress's invitation to join it (in Jammu & Kashmir) and praised Rahul Gandhi for his "efforts to unite India".
 Yogendra Yadav of Swaraj India joined Bharat Jodo Yatra and described the march as a Dakshinayana movement of India, in which the influences of the south are carried to the north.
 The Hindu-nationalist organisation Rashtriya Swayamsevak Sangh's chief Mohan Bhagwat appealed to minorities in the country, shortly after the start of the yatra. The INC saw this sudden outreach as an effect of the yatra's success.
  Acharya Satyendra Das, the chief priest of Ram Temple in Ayodhya, extended his wishes to Bharat Jodo Yatra. Senior Vishwa Hindu Parishad (VHP) leader and the Ram Temple trust's general secretary, Champat Rai acknowledged Rahul Gandhi and stated: "A 50-year-old 'young' man is walking in this chilling weather to know India. What else we can do if not appreciate his efforts.”

International 

 In September 2022, Hollywood actor John Cusack extended his support to Bharat Jodo Yatra and said he stands in solidarity with "anti-fascists everywhere".

Controversies 
The Bharat Jodo Yatra was criticized for not passing through the poll-bound states of Gujarat and Himachal Pradesh. Congress leader Jairam Ramesh defended the decision, stating this was because it would take 90–95 days to reach Gujarat, starting from Kanyakumari; according to Ramesh, "It would be impossible to reach before the elections, same with Himachal Pradesh". He also said in the states where the yatra would not be able to go, he and another senior Congress leader Digvijaya Singh, along with many others, would visit them.

The workers then damaged the vendor's weighing machine and vegetables. The workers were immediately suspended from the Congress party. Kerala Pradesh Congress Committee chief K. Sudhakaran expressed regret over the incident, calling it "unacceptable" and "inexcusable".

Fake news

Many fake news items have been spread about the yatra, some of them are listed below:

On 23 September 2022, the Congress paused the yatra at Thrissur for a rest day, which was apparently the day when the Popular Front of India (PFI), an Islamist organisation, gave a "bandh" call in Kerala in response to the National Investigation Agency (NIA)'s raids on it the day before. BJP leader Kapil Mishra linked this pause of the yatra to the bandh and said the Congress was in solidarity with the PFI. The Congress refuted Mishra's comments, saying the pause was scheduled and completely unrelated to the PFI. Rahul Gandhi also said there should be no tolerance towards all forms of communalism in response to a journalist's question on the PFI raid.

BJP leaders circulated a factually incorrect tweet on around 23 September; the tweet said a girl who hugged Rahul Gandhi in a picture taken at the yatra had used the slogan "Pakistan Zindabad" at an anti-CAA rally led by AIMIM in Bengaluru; the contents of the tweet were found to be false. On 25 September, the Indian National Congress initiated legal action against BJP leader Priti Gandhi for allegedly spreading "fake and divisive news" on the yatra.

On 7 December, Congress Twitter accounts started circulating images of a crowd organised at Jai Gurudev Ashram in Mathura, saying they were taken at Bharat Jodo Yatra.

Resistance
The Congress and the BJP got into an argument after hoardings in Gundlupet, Karnataka, welcoming Bharat Jodo Yatra were ripped down on September 29, 2022. One poster depicted Savarkar. Congress attributed the problem to "miscreants". Savarkar's image was previously seen on a Bharat Jodo Yatra poster in Kerala.

Protests 
During the Karnataka leg of the yatra, the Congress experienced a few problems. Following the appearance of Rahul Gandhi's image on the Karnataka flag, pro-Kannada people protested against the image and warned the Congress not to use Gandhi's image on the flag.

Farmers protested during the Rajasthan leg of the yatra, protesting against the failure of the state's Congress-led government to deliver on Rahul Gandhi's election promise of a farm-loan waiver. They also complained about water scarcity.

Petitions in High Court 
Division Bench of the Kerala High Court dismissed a public-interest lawsuit that sought to control Bharat Jodo Yatra, which the petitioner said was impeding both vehicular and pedestrian traffic on public streets.

Impact
On the fourth day of the Bharat Jodo Yatra, Rahul Gandhi reopened a road that had been closed in 1993 due to caste-based violence. In Badanavalu, a route called "Bharat Jodo Road" connects Lingayat settlements with Dalit dwellings. According to officials, on 7 October 2022, Rajasthan's Chief Minister Ashok Gehlot officially opened a  elevated road in Jaipur. According to them, the chief minister renamed the route, which was formerly known as Sodala elevated road, to "Bharat Jodo Setu".

Other planned yatras 

The Indian National Congress, inspired by the success of Bharat Jodo Yatra, started or planned separate-but-related yatras in other states.

On 22 September, the Congress started a similar yatra in Gujarat which they called "Yuva Parivartan Yatra" (Youth for Change Yatra), which began in Ambaji and ended in Gujarat, passing through several towns and cities. It included many GPCC and Gujarat Youth Congress leaders and passed through 27 districts. It would be held in two stages from Ambaji to Umargam and Somanth to Suigam.

In Odisha, a yatra covered  and lasted for 100 days, starting on 31 October as a show of strength for the Congress. The rally started from Bhubaneswar and transited cities Cuttack, Jajpur, Balasore, and others. Many Congress party state units will also start mass-contact programs.

Former chief minister of Karnataka Siddaramaiah, and KPCC president D. K. Shivakumar organised a new yatra beginning in early December that visited all 224 assembly constituencies to maintain the momentum started by Bharat Jodo Yatra until the 2023 Assembly election.

Responses 

Basavaraj Bommai, the chief minister of Karnataka, and BJP politician BS Yediyurappa launched a countermarch named "Jana Sankalpa Yatra" on 11 October 2022; this yatra would visit 52 assembly constituencies as a political response to the Congress' Bharat Jodo Yatra.

The BJP started a march called "Jan Aakrosh Yatra" in Rajasthan on December 1 as a protest against the Ashok Gehlot government in the state. Turnout for the event was poor, it received low public support, and the BJP leaders expressed displeasure with the issue.

Though having received invitations from the Congress party, Bahujan Samaj party leader Mayawati and Samajwadi party leader Akhilesh Yadav did not participate in Bharat Jodo Yatra.

Aftermath 
According to a November 2022 survey by CVoter, Rahul Gandhi's approval ratings rose drastically after the Bharat Jodo Yatra, although they were still a bit low compared to January 2019 ratings.

Many political analysts have determined that the yatra has resulted in a resurgent public image of Gandhi, which had been long damaged by the BJP.

Phase II
In September 2022, the Congress Party said it planned to hold a second phase of the yatra from west-to-east in 2023, from Gujarat to Arunachal Pradesh. Congress planned another march in 2023 from Porbandar in Gujarat to Parshuram Kund in Arunachal Pradesh. 

On 26 February 2023, Congress General Secretary in-charge Communications Jairam Ramesh informed that Congress is considering a Pasighat-to-Porbandar yatra.

References

External links 

Next Indian general election
Indian National Congress campaigns
Indian general election campaigns
2022 in Indian politics
Indian National Congress